Michelangelo Baracchi Bonvicini is president of Atomium - European Institute for Science, Media and Democracy, which was launched together with former French President Valéry Giscard d'Estaing on 27 November 2009 at the European Parliament.

Early life 
Baracchi Bonvicini was born in London and grew up in Italy. He graduated in history at the University of Bologna. He reported on the war in Kosovo (1999) for the Italian editorial group Quotidiano Nazionale from Kosovo, Albania and Montenegro. He also reported from Israel and Palestine the second Intifada. He wrote for the Italian newspaper Libero (2003) from Afghanistan, Pakistan and Iran, following the US invasion of Afghanistan. In 2003 he published Sognando Gerusalemme resulting from his reporting from Israel and Palestine in 2002.

Career
With Valéry Giscard d’Estaing, Baracchi Bonvicini founded Atomium - European Institute for Science, Media and Democracy in November 2009 at the European Parliament in Brussels, together with twenty-two rectors and presidents from the partner universities.

In 2011, Baracchi Bonvicini and Giscard d’Estaing received the medal "Plus Ratio Quam Vis" from the Polish university Jagiellonian University for "their contribution to the European academic community by founding the institute".

In September 2012, during the negotiations regarding the EU budget for 2014–2020, Baracchi Bonvicini and Giscard d’Estaing together with former prime minister of Spain Felipe González Márquez, jointly signed the appeal "For a European Consciousness, For a More Competitive Europe", asking EU member states to increase the budget for research and innovation. The appeal was sent to all European prime ministers and head of governments.

In 2016, Baracchi Bonvicini promoted together with Massimo Marchiori the set-up of REIsearch, a non-profit initiative co-funded by the European Commission, Nokia, Elsevier, and other Atomium partners. The aim is to connect researchers and policy makers on topics linked to scientific research in order to promote evidence-based policy making. REIsearch has focused on chronic diseases, next generation internet] and digital skills.

Under the auspices of Atomium-EISMD, in 2018 Baracchi Bonvicini and Luciano Floridi promoted AI4People, a forum bringing together key actors interested in shaping the social impact of new applications of AI. AI4People presented at the European Parliament the "AI4People’s Ethical Framework for a Good AI Society: Opportunities, Risks, Principles, and Recommendations" during the "Towards a Good AI Society Summit" opened by Tony Blair. This work guided the identification of 7 Key Requirements for a Trustworthy AI presented by the Commission in April 2019.

References

External links 
 http://www.eismd.eu

Living people
Italian male writers
University of Bologna alumni
Year of birth missing (living people)